Messrs. Thomas C. Brown-Westhead, Moore & Co. was a manufacturer of China, earthenware, including high quality innovative Victorian majolica and sanitary goods at Cauldon Place, Stoke-upon-Trent in England from 1856.

See also
Victorian majolica

References
The Potteries (illustrated) 1893 advertising and trade journal

External links
https://ridgwaypatternbook.org.uk/cauldon.html#bwm

Ceramics manufacturers of England
British porcelain
Staffordshire pottery